Hajipur Lok Sabha constituency is one of the 40 Lok Sabha constituencies in the eastern Indian state of Bihar.

Hajipur Lok Sabha constituency is reserved for SC. Former Bihar Chief Minister Ram Sundar Das first contested from this seat in 1957 as a Socialist when he was 36 years old, and 57 years later in 2014 for Nitish Kumar's JD-U when he was 93. He lost both those polls but won in 1991 and 2009.

From 1977 to 2019, this seat was dominated by Ram Vilas Paswan who won eight times from here and lost only twice, in 1984 and 2009. In 1991 Paswan contested and won from Rosera, the only time in 42 years that he did not contest from Hajipur. In 2019 he vacated the seat for his younger brother Pashupati Kumar Paras. In 1977, Paswas polled 89.3% votes, probably the highest voting percentage ever, and he also established a record (since broken) of securing a majority of 4.24 lakh votes. Sitting PM Narasimha Rao secured 89.48% votes in 1991 but that was in a bye-poll, not General Election, for Nandyal seat.

Vidhan Sabha segments 
Hajipur Lok Sabha constituency comprises the following six Vidhan Sabha (legislative assembly) segments:

Members of Lok Sabha

Election results

General Elections 2019

General Elections 2014

General Elections 2009

General Elections 1989

General Elections 1977

See also
 Vaishali district
 List of Constituencies of the Lok Sabha

References

External links
Hajipur lok sabha  constituency election 2019 result details

Hajipur
Lok Sabha constituencies in Bihar
Politics of Vaishali district